The barred grass snake (Natrix helvetica) is a non-venomous colubrid snake from Western Europe, living in and close to water. It was included within the grass snake species, Natrix natrix, until August 2017, when genetic analysis led to its reclassification as a separate species.

Subspecies 
There are currently five subspecies of Natrix helvetica recognized (having been formerly classified as subspecies of N. natrix):
N. helvetica helvetica (syn. N. natrix helvetica) 
N. helvetica cetti (syn. N. natrix cetti)
N. helvetica corsa (syn. N. natrix corsa)
N. helvetica lanzai (syn. N. natrix lanzai)
N. helvetica sicula (syn. N. natrix sicula)

Description 

The barred grass snake has a dark grey-green upper body with characteristic black barring along the flanks.  The underparts are pale. It has a distinctive yellow and black collar around the neck, a feature it shares with the grass snake. It can grow to a length of over a metre.

Distribution 
The species is found in Great Britain as far north as southern Scotland, and in the Netherlands, western Germany, Switzerland, Italy and France. The nominate subspecies N. h. helvetica has the widest distribution: from Britain to the Pyrenees and the Rhine region.

Ecology

Feeding

Grass snakes prey mainly on amphibians, especially the common toad and the common frog, although they may also occasionally eat ants and larvae. Captive snakes have been observed taking earthworms offered by hand, but dead prey items are never taken. The snake will search actively for prey, often on the edges of the water, using sight and sense of smell (using Jacobson's organ). They consume prey live without using constriction.

Grass snakes are semi-aquatic. Amphibians make up the majority of their diet and they also eat fish and some small land mammals. Females are often longer than males (27.5 to 35 inches), which leads to most of the predation on land being caused by large adult females.

Hibernation 
Since grass snakes are located in the cooler climate of northern Europe and Great Britain and live near bodies of water, they will spend a significant portion of the year hibernating, typically throughout the coldest months. Hibernation periods can begin as early as October, when temperatures start to drop, and may last up until April. The Barred Grass snakes will find any sort of shelter that they can seek refuge from the harsh weather, or may burrow underground in order to maintain a stable body temperature, and remain there during hibernation.

Habitat
Grass snakes are strong swimmers and may be found close to freshwater, although there is evidence individual snakes often do not need bodies of water throughout the entire season.

The preferred habitat appears to be open woodland and "edge" habitat, such as field margins and woodland borders, as these may offer adequate refuge while still affording ample opportunity for thermoregulation through basking. Pond edges are also favoured and the relatively high chance of observing this secretive species in such areas may account for their perceived association with ponds and water.

Grass snakes, as with most reptiles, are at the mercy of the thermal environment and need to overwinter in areas which are not subject to freezing. Thus they typically spend the winter underground where the temperature is relatively stable.

Reproduction

As spring approaches, the males emerge first and spend much of the day basking in an effort to raise body temperature and thereby metabolism. This may be a tactic to maximise sperm production, as the males mate with the females as soon as they emerge up to two weeks later in April, or earlier if environmental temperatures are favourable. The leathery-skinned eggs are laid in batches of eight to 40 in June to July and hatch after about 10 weeks. To survive and hatch, the eggs require a temperature of at least , but preferably , with high humidity. Areas of rotting vegetation, such as compost heaps, are preferred locations.

Migration
After breeding in summer, snakes tend to hunt and may range widely during this time, moving up to several hundred metres in a day. Prey items tend to be large compared to the size of the snake, and this impairs the movement ability of the snake. Snakes which have recently eaten rarely move any significant distance and will stay in one location, basking to optimize their body temperature until the prey item has been digested. Individual snakes may only need two or three significant prey items throughout an entire season.

Ecdysis (moulting)

Ecdysis occurs at least once during the active season. As the outer skin wears and the snake grows, the new skin forms underneath the old, including the eye scales which may turn a milky blue/white colour at this time referred to as being 'in blue'. The blue-white colour comes from an oily secretion between the old and new skins; the snake's coloration will also look dull, as though the animal is dusty. This process affects the eyesight of the snakes and they do not move or hunt during this time; they are also, in common with most other snakes, more irritable. The outer skin is eventually sloughed in one piece (inside-out) and normal movement activity is resumed.

Defence
In defence they can produce a garlic-smelling fluid from the anal glands, and feign death (thanatosis) by becoming completely limp when they may also secrete blood (autohaemorrhage) from the mouth and nose. They may also perform an aggressive display in defence, hissing and striking without opening the mouth. They rarely bite in defence. When caught they often regurgitate the contents of their stomachs.

Grass snakes display a rare defensive behavior involving raising the front of the body and flattening the head and neck so that it resembles a cobra's hood, although the geographic ranges of grass snakes and of cobras overlap very little. However, the fossil record shows that the extinct European cobra Naja romani occurs in Miocene-aged strata of France, Germany, Austria, Romania, and Ukraine and thus overlapped with Natrix species including the extinct Natrix longivertebrata, suggesting that the grass snake's behavioral mimicry of cobras is a fossil behavior, although it may protect against predatory birds which migrate to Africa for the winter and encounter cobras there. However, such behaviour is not reported for the species in Britain.

Another form of defensive mimicry that grass snakes demonstrate is the triangulation of their head. Typically, venomous snakes have more triangular heads while nonvenomous snakes’ heads tend to be more rounded, such as the grass snakes. However, grass snakes have the ability to triangulate their heads in defense to trick potential predators into believing they are venomous and could fight back. This technique works because the grass snake shares a range with many venomous snakes, including Vipera aspis.

Protection and threats
The species has various predator species, including corvids, storks, owls, raptors, common pheasant, foxes, and the domestic cat.

In Great Britain, they are protected under the Wildlife and Countryside Act 1981 and cannot be harmed or traded without a licence, although they may legally be captured and kept in captivity.

In 2007 (before reclassification), the grass snake was included on the updated UK Biodiversity Action Plan as a species in need of conservation and greater protection.

References

Natrix
Reptiles of Europe
Reptiles described in 1789
Taxa named by Bernard Germain de Lacépède